Benzyl fluoride is an organic compound consisting of a benzene ring substituted with a fluoromethyl group.

See also
 Benzyl chloride
 Benzyl bromide
 Benzyl iodide

References 

Organofluorides
Benzyl compounds